Deroplatyinae is a subfamily in the new (2019) family Deroplatyidae, containing species found in South-East Asia.

Tribes and selected genera
The Mantodea Species File lists the following:
 tribe Deroplatyini
 subtribe Deroplatyina
 Deroplatys Westwood, 1839
 subtribe Pseudempusina
 Mythomantis Giglio-Tos, 1916
 Pseudempusa Brunner v. W., 1893
 tribe Euchomenellini
 Euchomenella Giglio-Tos, 1916 
 Indomenella Roy, 2008
 Phasmomantella Vermeersch, 2018
 Tagalomantis Hebard, 1920

Note: the genus Brancsikia Saussure & Zehntner, 1895 is now placed in the family Majangidae.

See also
List of mantis genera and species

References

External links
Tree of Life - Mantinae

 
Deroplatyidae
Mantodea subfamilies